Essam Khalil is an Egyptian businessman, and was one of the founders of the Free Egyptians Party (FEP). The party was founded in April 2011 and is backed by leading business, political, and cultural leaders. FEP supports the principles of a liberal, democratic, and secular political order in post-Mubarak Egypt.

Khalil was the second President of FEP.

References

Egyptian democracy activists
Free Egyptians Party politicians
Living people
Year of birth missing (living people)